Gerald Anthony Bucciarelli (July 31, 1951 – May 28, 2004) was an American actor.

Life and career
Anthony was born Gerald Anthony Bucciarelli, the son of Italian immigrants had roles and appearances on many shows such as Another World and L.A. Law.

He may be best-remembered for his role as Marco Dane on the ABC soap opera, One Life to Live, a role he played from 1977–86, and from 1989–90, and on fellow ABC serial General Hospital in 1992.

Marco arrived in Llanview as a low-life pimp and pornographer who was only supposed to last for 8 days, but Anthony's offbeat look as well as his impassioned performances and electric chemistry with co-star Judith Light (Karen Wolek) made him such a fan favorite that only a few months after producers killed off Marco in 1978 they revealed the real victim was Marco's heretofore unknown brother, Mario Corelli. Anthony was nominated for a Daytime Emmy Award for the role in 1982, and won for Marco on General Hospital in 1993.

During his absences from daytime, Anthony had many guest-starring roles on television and a recurring role as kind-hearted Father Pete Terranova on Wiseguy from 1988–89. Anthony also directed an independent film, Twisted, and episodes of All My Children.

He continued to appear sporadically in primetime; in early 2003 he played a bit part on As the World Turns; when asked why he had not returned to daytime sooner, he said "no one asked me."

Marriage
Anthony was  married to his One Life to Live co-star Brynn Thayer from 1981–83.

Death
Anthony died by suicide on May 28, 2004 at age 52 in Butler, New Jersey.

Filmography

References

External links

1951 births
2004 deaths
American male soap opera actors
Daytime Emmy Award winners
Daytime Emmy Award for Outstanding Supporting Actor in a Drama Series winners
Burials at Calvary Catholic Cemetery (Pittsburgh)
American male stage actors
20th-century American male actors
American people of Italian descent
2004 suicides
Suicides in New Jersey